Rafael "Paing" Hechanova Sr. (July 8, 1928 – August 26, 2021) was a Filipino basketball player who competed in the 1952 Summer Olympics.

Early life
Rafael "Paing" Hechanova was born on July 8, 1928 in the then-city of Jaro in Iloilo province.

Career

Playing career
Shortly after World War II, Hechanova played varsity basketball for the University of Santo Tomas's (UST) Glowing Goldies under coach Herminio Silva in the UAAP. He was recognized as Mr. Basketball in 1951 by the Philippine Sportswriters Association for helping UST win titles in the UAAP, National Inter-Collegiate, and National Senior. He also played for UST's volleyball and golf teams.

Hechanova suited up for the Philippines men's national team helping the team win the gold medal in the 1951 and 1954 editions. He was also part of the Philippine roster which competed in the 1956 Summer Olympics in Helsinki. He was considered for inclusion in the country's roster for the 1954 FIBA World Championship, but Hechanova already decided to retire and pursue a career in architecture having just passed the board exam at that time.

He also played for the YCO Painters in the Manila Industrial and Commercial Athletic Association (MICAA).

Post-retirement
Hechanova became involved again the MICAA as an official when the Concepcion Industries joined the league. He eventually became the league's president. When the Philippine Basketball Association was formed in 1975, he became the inaugural board of governors' second vice president. He was inducted to the National Basketball Hall of Fame in 2000. In 2002, he played a role in establishing the Philippine Olympians Association (POA). He served as chairman of the POA.

Personal life
Rafael Hechanova was married to Mely Conception until the latter's death in 2019. He was also largely involved in Rotary International serving as a director from 1996 to 1998. Rotary also tasked him and his wife to serve as Mother Teresa's aides during her visit in Manila in 1984. Cecil Hechanova, the founding chairman of the Philippine Sports Commission, was also Rafael's brother.

Death
Hechanova died at the age of 93 on August 26, 2021.

References

External links
 

1928 births
2021 deaths
Sportspeople from Iloilo City
Basketball players from Iloilo
Olympic basketball players of the Philippines
Basketball players at the 1952 Summer Olympics
Asian Games medalists in basketball
Basketball players at the 1951 Asian Games
Basketball players at the 1954 Asian Games
Philippines men's national basketball team players
Filipino men's basketball players
Asian Games gold medalists for the Philippines
Medalists at the 1951 Asian Games
UST Growling Tigers basketball players